Coprinellus bipellis is a species of mushroom in the family Psathyrellaceae. It was first described as Coprinus bipellis by Henri Romagnesi in 1976, and later transferred to the genus Coprinellus in 2006.

References

bipellis